Otto Nicodemus (21 June 1886 – 2 December 1966) was a German international footballer.

References

1886 births
1966 deaths
Association football defenders
German footballers
Germany international footballers